Vandu is a 2019 Indian action drama film directed by debutante Vashan Shaji and starring newcomers Chinu, SR Guna, Shigaa and Allwin with Sai Dheena in a negative role.

Cast 
 Chinu 
 SR Guna as Guna
 Shigaa as Aparna 
 Allwin as Logu 
 Sai Dheena as Dheena 
 Rama 
 Maha Gandhi
 Ravi Shankar
 Winner Ramachandran
 Phuvaneshwari

Production 
The film is directed by Vashan Shaji, a former assistant to Selvaraghavan, and is inspired by street fights that used to take place in North Chennai in 1971. Malayalam actress Shigaa plays the heroine while Sai Dheena portrays the antagonist. Several newcomers play the lead roles. The film is set in the present day and was shot in Chennai for 63 days.

Soundtrack 
The songs were composed by A. R. Neshan.

Release 
A critic from the Cinema Express gave the film a rating of one out of five stars and wrote that "the performances aren’t convincing enough to make us buy into the conflict, and overall this looks like a short film that has been shot on a small budget".

References

External links 

Indian action drama films
2019 action drama films
2010s Tamil-language films